York Preparatory School, commonly referred to as York Prep School, is an independent, university-preparatory school in the Upper West Side area of Manhattan, New York City, near Lincoln Square.

The coeducational school provides instruction to approximately 410 students between 6th and 12th grades. The student:teacher ratio is 5:1.

York Prep is approved by the New York State Board of Regents and accredited by the Middle States Association of Colleges and Schools.

For the 2022–2023 school year, tuition is US$58,000 including fees for students in every grade, tuition for students in the school's ITP program is $71,000, and tuition for students in the school's "Jump Start" program is $86,800.

History
Founded and owned by Ronald and Jayme Stewart (née Spahn), York Prep opened its doors in September 1969 to 158 students in grades 6-12 and by 1972 had 212 students. Ronald Stewart serves as headmaster and his wife Jayme Stewart is director of college guidance. Jayme Stewart, who has shared college entry tips with CNN, is also the author of a 1991 book, How to Get into the College of Your Choice: And How to Finance It.  York is a for-profit school; Jayme Stewart's brother Stephen H. Spahn owns another for-profit school in New York City, the Dwight School.

Academics
The curriculum provides a foundation in the traditional core subjects of a liberal arts education—English, mathematics, social studies, science, and foreign language. In addition, students can choose from a wide range of specialized electives.

The school uses a system called "tracking," which places students in one of several ability groups available in every subject area. This allows students to work at an advanced pace through Honors courses and the Scholars Program, in subjects in which they excel, and at a moderate pace in those subjects where they need more guidance.

The York Prep Scholars Program is a three-year sequence which provides a more challenging curriculum for York's most academically able students. Units on such topics such as "Neuroscience," "Italian Renaissance Art," "Statistics," and "Shakespeare Performance" are presented independently in mini-courses taught by members of the faculty who focus on their particular intellectual passions and specialties. In 2014, the program was expanded to include "Junior Scholars" (for 6th and 7th grades) and "Pre-Scholars" (for 8th and 9th graders) as well.

York Prep offers a Jump Start Program at supplemental cost to provide assistance to students with different learning styles and learning disabilities. The program offers participants two weekly one-on-one 40 minutes sessions with their assigned Jump Start teachers, morning check-ins with their teachers, and supervised group study sessions after school.

Sports and activities
York Prep offers the following sports:

Middle school
Boys' soccer
Cross country
Girls'  volleyball
Boys' basketball
Girls' basketball

Junior varsity
Boys'  basketball

Varsity
Boys' soccer 
Girls' soccer
Girls' volleyball 
Cross country
Boys'  baseball
Indoor track & field
Swimming
Girls' basketball
Golf
Tennis

Grading system
York Prep operates on a semester system. Numerical grades begin in grade 6 and run through grade 12. A grade point average of 85 or above constitutes being on the Honor Roll, while a grade point average of 90 or above constitutes being on the Headmasters List. The lowest failing grade is a 55%, while the highest failing grade is a 65%. Parents and students receive weekly grades and progress updates via an online grading book called . Each family signs in with a unique username and password to access their student's grades and progress in all academic subjects. Students receive quarterly grades four times per year.

Facilities
The school, which then housed 250 students, made news in 1997 when it expanded in an unusual transaction, trading property with Ramaz School. Ramaz purchased a new building for York Prep at 68th Street and traded that for the existing school at East 85th Street.

The property at West 68th Street is the original home of the Hebrew Union College – Jewish Institute. The new school site—a seven-level granite building—has three science laboratories, three technology centers, a library, performance and art studios and a sprung hardwood floor gymnasium, which has a fitness center, weight room and locker room facilities and a roof for beekeeping.

Most of the classrooms are carpeted and equipped with climate-control. All classrooms are equipped with smart technology including interactive whiteboards and Wi-Fi. Also, all 8th graders are provided with Chromebooks, which are added to tuition. Students and staff members all have personal computer accounts, and all staff members have school e-mail addresses. In addition, all homeroom classrooms play the weekly episode of the school's in-house television series WYRK.

Notable alumni

Liv Tyler, model and actress
Yannis Pappas, comedian
Robert E. Chambers, alumni, nicknamed the "Preppie Killer", is an American who pleaded guilty to manslaughter in the death of 18-year-old Jennifer Levin. He killed her in New York's Central Park during the early morning hours of August 26, 1986.
Alexis Rockman, artist
James De La Vega, artist
Phil Abraham, Emmy-nominated director of Mad Men
Michael Avedon, American fashion and portrait photographer
Samia Finnerty, musician

In news and popular culture
The front of the school was featured in the film "Elf" starring Will Ferrell.
The school and several of its students were featured in the series Ice-T's Rap School, a 6-part reality show aired on VH1 in 2006 where the rapper introduced eight of York Prep's students to rap and rap culture.
York Prep is mentioned in Season 1 Episode 3 of ABC's Castle "Hedge Fund Homeboys". York Prep students are referred to as "Yorkies" and mentioned as wearing uniforms.
York Prep is mentioned in Season 3 Episode 9 of The CW's Gossip Girl "They shoot the Humphries, Don't They?". The school "York" being referred to as "practically public school".
Director of College Guidance Jayme Stewart was featured in an article in U.S. News & World Report on volunteer opportunities for high school students
In the HBO original documentary Siempre, Luis about Luis A. Miranda Jr., an activist, father of Lin-Manuel Miranda, and father by adoption of Miguel who attended York Prep from 6th through 12th grade, Miguel is seen wearing a York Prep top and Luis talks about his success at a mainstream school, and the final episode is Miguel receiving his acceptance letter to his early decision first choice college (Skidmore).

References 

Educational institutions established in 1969
1969 establishments in New York City
Private high schools in Manhattan
Private middle schools in Manhattan
Preparatory schools in New York City
Upper West Side
For profit schools in Manhattan